Dimethylamphetamine (Metrotonin), also known as dimetamfetamine (INN), dimephenopan and N,N-dimethylamphetamine, is a stimulant drug of the phenethylamine and amphetamine chemical classes. Dimethylamphetamine has weaker stimulant effects than amphetamine or methamphetamine and is considerably less addictive and less neurotoxic compared to methamphetamine. However, it still retains some mild stimulant effects and abuse potential, and is a Schedule I controlled drug.

Dimethylamphetamine has occasionally been found in illicit methamphetamine laboratories, but is usually an impurity rather than the desired product. It may be produced by accident when methamphetamine is synthesised by methylation of amphetamine if the reaction temperature is too high or an excess of methylating agent is used.

It is said to be a prodrug of amphetamine/methamphetamine.

References

Norepinephrine-dopamine releasing agents
Prodrugs
Substituted amphetamines
Dimethylamino compounds